The pansexual flag is a pink, yellow and cyan flag, designed as a symbol for the pansexual community to increase its visibility and recognition, and distinguish itself from bisexuality.

History and use
The flag has been in wide use since the early 2010s when it was posted on an anonymous Tumblr account by its creator Jasper V. The flag functions as a symbol of the pansexual community, like the rainbow flag is used as a symbol for lesbian, gay, bisexual, transgender people and anyone else in the LGBT community. The pansexual pride flag is used to indicate that pansexuals have sexual attractions and relationships with people of different genders and sexualities. The theory of pansexuality aims to challenge existing prejudices, which can cause judgment, ostracism, and serious disorders within society.

Design and symbolism
The pansexual flag consists of three equally-sized colored horizontal bars, which are—from top to bottom—pink, yellow, and cyan. 

Some sources state that the cyan represents attraction to men, pink represents attraction to women, and yellow represents attraction to non-binary people such as those who are agender, bigender and genderfluid. Other sources state that the colours cyan, pink, and yellow stand for those who identify as men, women and non-binary people, respectively.

See also

 Pride flag
 Bisexual flag

References

2010 in LGBT history
Sexuality flags
Flags introduced in 2010
LGBT flags
Pansexuality